Varmints is the debut studio album by the Scottish composer and electronica musician Anna Meredith, released on 4 March 2016 on Moshi Moshi. The album won Scottish Album of the Year Award in 2016.

Critical reception

In a highly positive review for Pitchfork, Laura Snapes awarded Varmints with the website's "Best New Music" label, writing: "[Anna Meredith's] first wholly independent project reveals her to be one of the most innovative minds in modern British music: She wears her obvious theoretical grounding lightly and never lets it obstruct her ecstatic quest for new ideas and deranged stimuli. And Varmints is a knockout, the kind that makes you see cartoon stars."

Accolades

Track listing

References

External links
 

2016 debut albums
Anna Meredith albums
Scottish Album of the Year Award winners